Azura Dawn Storozynski (born November 8, 1981), known professionally as Azura Skye, is an American actress who first gained recognition for her role as Jane on The WB television sitcom Zoe, Duncan, Jack and Jane. She also had a 2-episode role as Cassie Newton in the seventh season of Buffy the Vampire Slayer.

Early life
Skye was born in her grandmother's home in Northridge, California. Her parents being amateur gemologists, named her after azurite, a semi-precious mineral. Azure is a color often associated with the sky; thus the middle name "Dawn" and the stage name "Azura Skye". Being from a show business family, she started her career as a stage actress at the age of three and toured Europe with the Santa Monica Playhouse theatre group at the age of eleven. She received her education at the Brentwood School.

Her grandfather, Brad Johnson, who died before her birth, was an actor known for his role as deputy sheriff Lofty Craig in the Western series, Annie Oakley (1954–1957), as well as a real estate developer in Los Angeles.

Career
Skye made her first television appearance on the show Total Security in 1997. Then she played a couple of smaller parts on Touched by an Angel and Chicago Hope, and made appearances in a number of television movies before she was cast for the role as "Jane" in Zoe, Duncan, Jack and Jane in 1999. Zoe..., as the show was renamed for the second season, was a short-lived (two seasons) sitcom about four teenagers – Skye's character being one of them. In 2000, the same year that Zoe... ended, Skye's first major movie production premiered. In 28 Days, she starred alongside Sandra Bullock and Viggo Mortensen.

Two years later, in 2002, Skye appeared in two episodes of the television series Buffy the Vampire Slayer. In the episode "Help" she plays Cassie Newton, a teen girl at Sunnydale High who possesses the power of precognition and who foresees her own death, and whom Buffy tries to help. In the episode "Conversations with Dead People", she plays an incarnation of the First Evil, impersonating a ghost of Cassie, who attempts to persuade Willow to commit suicide by pretending to bring a message from her dead girlfriend Tara.

Also in 2002, she appeared in Confessions of an Ugly Stepsister alongside Matthew Goode and Stockard Channing.

During this time she also appeared in other projects, doing smaller parts. She has played Susie Keaton in four episodes of CSI: Miami and has made guest appearances in shows such as Smallville and Judging Amy. Skye has also played parts in movies like Bandits (with Bruce Willis and Cate Blanchett), The Salton Sea (with Val Kilmer) and Red Dragon (with Anthony Hopkins).

Skye appeared as Ruby Bates in the 2006 drama Heavens Fall. In 2007, she starred as Sara in 20 Years After and in What We Do Is Secret. In 2008, she had a major part in the American remake of the Japanese horror movie One Missed Call, which was released in the US on January 4, 2008.

Her most recent television appearances include the voice of Veronica in an episode of American Dad!, fall 2007 episodes of House M.D., Bones and Ghost Whisperer, a 2009 episode of The Mentalist, and Fiona in American Horror Story: Murder House.

Filmography

References

External links

1981 births
Living people
20th-century American actresses
21st-century American actresses
Actresses from Los Angeles
American child actresses
American film actresses
American television actresses
American voice actresses
People from Northridge, Los Angeles
American people of Polish descent